Pembroke is a small community in Tobago  with a tropical climate. It has a noted waterfall within its heritage park.

References

Populated places in Tobago